There were two wars known as the Mongol invasions of Burma:

 The First Mongol invasion of Burma (1277–1287)
 The Second Mongol invasion of Burma (1300–1302)